The Eastern Townships Mounted Rifles was a cavalry regiment of the Non-Permanent Active Militia of the Canadian Militia (now the Canadian Army). In 1936, the regiment was converted from cavalry to artillery and became the 27th Field Artillery Regiment, Royal Canadian Artillery (currently on the Supplementary Order of Battle).

Lineage 

 Originated on 1 April 1910, in Coaticook, Quebec, as the 26th Canadian Horse (Stanstead Dragoons).
 Redesignated on 3 September 1912, as the 26th Stanstead Dragoons.
 Redesignated on 15 March 1920, as The Eastern Townships Mounted Rifles.
 Converted on 14 December 1936, from cavalry to artillery and redesignated as the 27th Field Brigade, RCA (now the 27th Field Artillery Regiment, RCA - currently on the Supplementary Order of Battle).

Perpetuations 

 5th Battalion, Canadian Mounted Rifles

The Eastern Townships Mounted Rifles were first granted the perpetuation of the 5th Regiment, Canadian Mounted Rifles. In 1936, after the regiment was converted to artillery, the perpetuation of the 5th Battalion, CMR, was also granted to the 7th/11th Hussars, which today are part of the Sherbrooke Hussars.

History

Early History 
The regiment was originally formed on 1 April 1910, as the 26th Canadian Horse (Stanstead Dragoons) in Coaticook, Quebec. It had squadrons located in Coaticook, Magog, Stanstead and Ayer's Cliff.

On 3 September 1912, the regiment was renamed as the 26th Stanstead Dragoons.

The Great War 
On 7 November 1914, the 5th Regiment, Canadian Mounted Rifles was authorized for service and on 18 July 1915, the regiment embarked for Great Britain. On 24 October 1915, the regiment disembarked in France where it fought as part of the 2nd Brigade, Canadian Mounted Rifles. On 3 January 1916, the regiment was converted to infantry and Redesignated as the 5th Battalion, Canadian Mounted Rifles and was assigned to the 8th Infantry Brigade, 3rd Canadian Division where it fought in France and Flanders until the end of the war in November 1918. On 30 August 1920, the battalion was disbanded.

1920s-1930s 
On 15 March 1920, as a result of the Canadian Militia reforms following the Otter Commission, the 26th Stanstead Dragoons were renamed for the final time as The Eastern Townships Mounted Rifles.

On 14 December 1936, as part of the 1936 Canadian Militia reorganization, The Eastern Townships Mounted Rifles were converted to artillery and became the 27th Field Brigade, RCA (later redesignated as the 27th Field Artillery Regiment, Royal Canadian Artillery - now on the Supplementary Order of Battle).

Uniform 
The 26th Stanstead Dragoons in full dress wore a scarlet dragoon tunic with black facings and dark blue trousers with a broad yellow stripe. For regimental headdress, it consisted gilded helmet and badge (except for enamelled centre and silver scroll) with a black-over-white hair plume.

Battle Honours 
The regiment was granted these battle honours in 1929.
 Mount Sorrel
 Somme, 1916
 Flers-Courcelette
 Ancre Heights
 Arras, 1917, '18
 Vimy, 1917
 Hill 70
 Ypres, 1917
 Passchendaele
 Amiens
 Scarpe 1918
 Hindenburg Line
 Canal du Nord
 Cambrai, 1918
 Valenciennes
 Sambre
 France and Flanders, 1915-18

See also 

 List of regiments of cavalry of the Canadian Militia (1900–1920)

References

External links 
 https://www.bac-lac.gc.ca/eng/discover/military-heritage/Documents/RG9-58_EN-final.pdf
 https://milart.blog/2015/08/23/eastern-canada-volunteer-cavalry-1896-1914/

Mounted rifle regiments of Canada
Military units and formations of Quebec
Supplementary Order of Battle